Sunndalsfjorden (or just Sunndalsfjord) is a fjord in Sunndal Municipality in Møre og Romsdal county, Norway. It begins at the Ballsneset peninsula, at the municipal boundary of Sunndal and extends south to the village of Sunndalsøra. Other villages along the fjord include Jordalsgrenda and Øksendalsøra. The main inflow of the fjord is the river Driva which flows into the fjord at Sunndalsøra. Norwegian National Road 70 runs along the northeastern part of the fjord near Sunndalsøra.

See also
 List of Norwegian fjords

References

Fjords of Møre og Romsdal
Sunndal